The Washington Capitals (colloquially known as the Caps) are a professional ice hockey team based in Washington, D.C. The team competes in the National Hockey League (NHL) as a member of the Metropolitan Division in the Eastern Conference, and is owned by Monumental Sports & Entertainment, headed by Ted Leonsis. The Capitals initially played their home games at the Capital Centre in Landover, Maryland, before moving to the Capital One Arena in Washington, D.C., in 1997.

In , David Poile was hired as general manager, helping to turn the franchise's fortunes around. With a core of players such as Mike Gartner, Rod Langway, Larry Murphy, and Scott Stevens, the Capitals became a regular playoff contender for the next fourteen seasons. After purchasing the team in 1999, Leonsis revitalized the franchise by drafting star players such as Alexander Ovechkin, Nicklas Backstrom, John Carlson, and Braden Holtby. The 2009–10 Capitals won the franchise's first Presidents' Trophy for being the team with the most points at the end of the regular season. They won it a second time in 2015–16, and for a third time the following season in 2016–17. In addition to 12 division titles and three Presidents' Trophies, the Capitals have reached the Stanley Cup Finals in 1998 and 2018, winning in the latter.

The Capitals have retired the use of four numbers in honor of four players. In addition, the team holds an association with a number of individuals inducted into the Hockey Hall of Fame. The Capitals are presently affiliated with two minor league teams: the Hershey Bears of the American Hockey League and the South Carolina Stingrays of the ECHL.

History

Early years (1974–1982)
The NHL awarded an expansion franchise to the city of Washington on June 8, 1972, and the Capitals joined the NHL as an expansion team for the 1974–75 season along with the Kansas City Scouts. The Capitals were owned by Abe Pollin (also owner of the National Basketball Association's Washington Bullets/Wizards). Pollin had built the Capital Centre in suburban Landover, Maryland, to house both the Bullets (who formerly played in Baltimore) and the Capitals. His first act as owner was to hire Hall of Famer Milt Schmidt as general manager.

With a combined 30 teams between the NHL and the World Hockey Association (WHA), the available talent was stretched thin. The Capitals had few players with professional experience and were at a disadvantage against the long-standing teams that were stocked with veteran players.

The Capitals' inaugural season was dreadful, even by expansion standards. They finished with the worst record in the league at 8–67–5; their 21 points were half that of their expansion brethren, the Scouts. The eight wins are the fewest for an NHL team playing at least 70 games, and the .131 winning percentage is still the worst in NHL history. They also set records for most road losses (39 out of 40), most consecutive road losses (37), and most consecutive losses (17). Head coach Jim Anderson said, "I'd rather find out my wife was cheating on me than keep losing like this. At least I could tell my wife to cut it out." Schmidt himself had to take over the coaching reins late in the season.

In 1975–76, Washington went 25 straight games without a win and allowed 394 goals en route to another horrendous record: 11–59–10 (32 points). In the middle of the season, Schmidt was replaced as general manager by Max McNab and as head coach by Tom McVie. For the rest of the 1970s and early 1980s, the Capitals alternated between dreadful seasons and finishing only a few points out of the Stanley Cup playoffs; in 1980 and 1981, for instance, they were in playoff contention until the last day of the season. The one bright spot during these years of futility was that many of McNab's draft picks (e.g., Rick Green, Ryan Walter, Mike Gartner, Bengt Gustafsson, Gaetan Duchesne, and Bobby Carpenter) would impact the team for years to come, either as important members of the roster or as crucial pieces in major trades.

Pollin stuck it out through the Capitals' first decade, even though they were usually barely competitive. This stood in contrast to the Scouts; they were forced to move to Denver after only two years because their original owners did not have the resources or patience to withstand the struggles of an expansion team. By the summer of 1982, however, there was serious talk of the team moving out of the U.S. capital, and a "Save the Caps" campaign was underway.

Gartner–Langway era (1982–1993)

In August 1982, the team hired David Poile as general manager. As his first move, Poile pulled off one of the largest trades in franchise history on September 9, 1982, when he dealt longtime regulars Ryan Walter and Rick Green to the Montreal Canadiens in exchange for Rod Langway (named captain only a few weeks later), Brian Engblom, Doug Jarvis and Craig Laughlin. This move turned the franchise around, as Langway's solid defense helped the team to dramatically reduce its goals-against, and the explosive goal-scoring of Dennis Maruk, Mike Gartner and Bobby Carpenter fueled the offensive attack. Another significant move was the drafting of defenseman Scott Stevens during the 1982 NHL Entry Draft (the pick was made by interim general manager Roger Crozier, prior to Poile's hiring). The result was a 29-point jump, a third-place finish in the powerful Patrick Division, and the team's first playoff appearance in 1983. Although they were eliminated by the three-time-defending (and eventual) Stanley Cup champion New York Islanders (three games to one), the Caps' dramatic turnaround ended any talk of the club leaving Washington.

Fourteen consecutive playoff appearances (1983–1996)
The Capitals would make the playoffs for each of the next 14 years in a row, becoming known for starting slow before catching fire in January and February. However, regular-season success did not carry into the playoffs. Despite a continuous march of stars like Gartner, Carpenter, Langway, Gustafsson, Stevens, Mike Ridley, Dave Christian, Dino Ciccarelli, Larry Murphy, and Kevin Hatcher, Washington was knocked out in either the first or second round seven years in a row. In 1985–86, for instance, the Caps finished with 107 points and won 50 games for the first time in franchise history, good enough for the third-best record in the NHL. They defeated the Islanders in the first round but were eliminated in the second round by the New York Rangers.

The 1986–87 season brought even more heartbreak, with a loss to the Islanders in the Patrick Division Semifinals. This series was capped off by the classic Easter Epic game, which ended at 1:56 am on Easter Sunday 1987. The Capitals had thoroughly dominated most of the game, outshooting the Islanders 75–52, but lost in overtime when goaltender Bob Mason was beaten on a Pat LaFontaine shot from the blue line. For the 1989 playoff push, Gartner and Murphy were traded to the Minnesota North Stars in exchange for Ciccarelli and defenseman Bob Rouse. However, the goaltending once again faltered and they were eliminated in the first round by the Philadelphia Flyers. The Capitals finally made the Wales Conference Finals in 1990, but went down in a four-game sweep at the hands of the first-place Boston Bruins.

Bondra–Gonchar era (1993–2005)
From 1991 to 1996, the Capitals would lose in either the first or the second round of the playoffs. They would eliminate the Rangers in the first round but lost the second round to the Pittsburgh Penguins in 1991. In 1992 and 1993, they would lose in the first round to the Penguins and the Islanders, respectively. In 1994, they won their first-round series against the Penguins but lost in the second round to the Rangers. In 1995 and 1996, they lost in the first round both times to the Penguins. They would miss the playoffs in 1997, but they came close to winning their first Stanley Cup one year later.

First Stanley Cup Finals appearance (1998)

Then in 1998, as the Caps opened MCI Center, Peter Bondra's 52 goals led the team, veterans Dale Hunter, Joe Juneau and Adam Oates returned to old form, and Olaf Kolzig had a solid .920 save percentage as the Caps got past the Boston Bruins, Ottawa Senators and Buffalo Sabres (the latter on a dramatic overtime win in game six on a goal by Joe Juneau) en route to the team's first Stanley Cup finals appearance. The Capitals won six overtime games, three in each of their series against the Bruins and Sabres. However, the team was outmatched by the defending champions, the Detroit Red Wings, who won in a four-game sweep. That same season, Oates, Phil Housley and Hunter all scored their 1,000th career point, the only time in NHL history that one team had three players reach that same milestone in a single season.

Disappointments and rebuilding (1998–2004)
After their 1998 championship run, the Capitals finished the 1998–99 season with a record of 31-45-6 and failed to qualify for the playoffs. During the season, the team was sold to a group headed by AOL executive Ted Leonsis. The Capitals went on to win back-to-back Southeast Division titles in 2000 and 2001, yet both years lost in the first round of the playoffs to the Penguins. After the 2000–01 season, Adam Oates demanded a trade but management refused and stripped him of his team captaincy.

In the summer of 2001, the Capitals landed five-time Art Ross Trophy winner Jaromir Jagr, by trading three young prospects to the Pittsburgh Penguins. Jagr was signed to the largest contract ever in NHL history – $77 million over seven years at an average salary of $11 million per year (over $134,000 per game), with an option for an eighth year. However, after Adam Oates was traded to the Philadelphia Flyers, the Capitals failed to defend their division title and missed the playoffs in 2002 despite a winning record. Still, the 2001–02 season marked the highest attendance in franchise history, drawing in 710,990 fans and 17,341 per game.

Before the 2002–03 season, the Caps made more roster changes, including the signing of highly regarded Robert Lang as a free agent, a linemate of Jagr's from Pittsburgh. Washington returned to the playoffs in 2003, but disappointed fans again by losing in six games to the Tampa Bay Lightning after starting off with a two-game lead in the best-of-seven first-round series. The series is well-remembered for the three-overtime Game 6 at the then–MCI Center. At the time it was the longest game in the building's history and was eventually decided by a power-play goal by Tampa Bay.

In the 2003–04 season, the Caps unloaded much of their high-priced talent – not just a cost-cutting spree, but also an acknowledgment that their attempt to build a contender with high-priced veteran talent had failed. Jagr had never lived up to expectations during his time with the Capitals, failing to finish among the league's top scorers or make the postseason All-Star team. The Caps tried to trade Jagr, but as only one year was left on the existing NHL Collective Bargaining Agreement (CBA) before it expired, few teams were willing to risk $11 million on an underperforming player. In 2004, Jagr was finally sent to the New York Rangers in exchange for Anson Carter and an agreement that Washington would pay approximately $4 million per year of Jagr's salary, with Jagr himself agreeing to defer (with interest) $1 million per year for the remainder of his contract to allow the trade to go ahead. This was quickly followed by Peter Bondra departing for the Ottawa Senators. Not long after, Robert Lang was sent to the Detroit Red Wings, as well as Sergei Gonchar to the Boston Bruins. The Lang trade marked the first time in the history of the NHL that the league's leading scorer was traded in the middle of the season. The Capitals ended the year 23–46–10–3, tied for the second-worst record, along with the Chicago Blackhawks.

In the 2004 NHL Entry Draft, the Capitals won the Draft Lottery, moving ahead of the Pittsburgh Penguins, who held the NHL's worst record, and selected Alexander Ovechkin first overall. During the NHL labor dispute of 2004–05, which cost the NHL its entire season, Ovechkin stayed in Russia, playing for Dynamo Moscow. Several other Capitals played part or all of the lost season in Europe, including Olaf Kolzig, Brendan Witt, Jeff Halpern, and Alexander Semin. The Capitals' 2005 off-season consisted of making D.C.-area native Halpern the team's captain, signing Andrew Cassels, Ben Clymer, Mathieu Biron and Jamie Heward, and acquiring Chris Clark and Jeff Friesen via trade.

Ovechkin–Backstrom era (2005–present)

Building a contender (2005–2008)
The Capitals finished the 2005–06 season in the cellar of the Southeastern Division again, with a 29–41–12 campaign, earning 12 more points than the 2003–04 season, good for 27th out of the 30 NHL teams. The team, however, played close in every game, playing in 42 one-goal games, although losing two-thirds of those games. Ovechkin's rookie season exceeded the hype, as he led all 2005–06 NHL rookies in goals, points, power-play goals and shots. He finished third overall in the NHL in scoring and tied for third in goals, and his 425 shots not only led the league, but also set an NHL rookie record and was the fourth-highest total in NHL history. Ovechkin's rookie point total was the second-best in Capitals history, and his goal total was tied for third in franchise history. Ovechkin won the Calder Memorial Trophy, beating out Pittsburgh center Sidney Crosby and Calgary Flames defenseman Dion Phaneuf.

Many longtime Capitals had career years, with Dainius Zubrus netting 57 points, Halpern having a career-best 33 assists, Matt Pettinger putting in a career-best 20-goal, 38-point effort and seven others on the relatively young team topping 20 points for the first time. Two notable landmarks were also hit by Capitals, as the team's longest-tenured player, Olaf Kolzig, won his 250th game in goal, and Andrew Cassels became the 204th player to play 1,000 games, although he did not finish his season with Washington. A notable first was that Washington area native Jeff Halpern was named captain of his hometown Capitals. At the 2006 NHL trade deadline, on March 8, Brendan Witt was traded to the Nashville Predators.

In the 2006 off-season, Halpern left the Capitals to join the Dallas Stars; Chris Clark subsequently became the Capitals' new captain. Richard Zednik returned to the Capitals in 2006–07 after a disappointing 16-goal, 14-assist season in 2005–06 with the Montreal Canadiens, but was later dealt at the trade deadline to the New York Islanders after a disappointing and injury-plagued season. The Caps also signed former Philadelphia Flyers enforcer Donald Brashear. Despite the transactions, however, the Capitals finished with the same point total (70) in 2006–07 as they did the year before, although they won one fewer game. Ovechkin was the Capitals' lone representative in the season's All-Star Game, with Washington's campaign also seeing the breakout of Alexander Semin, who notched 38 goals in only his second NHL season.

The Capitals signed Swedish phenom Nicklas Backstrom, the fourth overall pick in the 2006 NHL Entry Draft, to a three-year entry-level contract. They also signed 19-year-old Semyon Varlamov to a three-year entry-level contract. They then went on to fill needs at defense, signing puck-moving defenseman Tom Poti; right wing, by signing Viktor Kozlov; and center, by signing playmaker Michael Nylander. As a result of these signings, there was much more hope for the 2007–08 season and players were looking towards the playoffs.

After starting the season 6–14–1, the Capitals fired head coach Glen Hanlon and replaced him with Hershey Bears head coach Bruce Boudreau on Thanksgiving Day, 2007. On January 10, 2008, the Capitals signed Ovechkin to an NHL-record $124 million contract extension at 13 years, the second-longest term of any contract in the NHL after New York Islanders goaltender Rick DiPietro's 15-year contract. Despite the Capitals' young defense and injuries to key players such as Michael Nylander and Brian Pothier, Boudreau engineered a remarkable turnaround. Aided by key acquisitions at the trade deadline (Matt Cooke, Sergei Fedorov and Cristobal Huet), Ovechkin's NHL-leading 65 goals, and Mike Green's league defensemen-leading 18 goals, the Capitals won the Southeast Division title for the first time since the 2000–01 season, edging out the Carolina Hurricanes for the Division title on the final game of the season. Washington's remarkable end-of-season run included winning 11 of the final 12 regular-season games. The Capitals became the first team in NHL history to make the playoffs after being ranked 14th or lower in their conference standings at the season's midpoint. For the postseason, the Capitals drew the Philadelphia Flyers in the first round and managed to force a Game 7 after being down three games to one in the series. However, they ultimately lost to the Flyers 3–2 in overtime. After the season concluded, Boudreau's efforts were rewarded with a long-term contract extension.

Return to playoffs and first Presidents' Trophy (2008–2015)

The accolades for the team continued to grow after the end of the season. Ovechkin won the Art Ross Trophy, the Maurice "Rocket" Richard Trophy, the Hart Memorial Trophy and the Lester B. Pearson Award, becoming the first player in NHL history to win all four awards in the same season. He also was the first player to win an MVP award in any major sport in the Washington, D.C., area since Joe Theismann won the National Football League (NFL) MVP award in 1983. Moreover, Ovechkin was also named an NHL First Team All-Star and became the first player since 1953 to be named as such in each of his first three years in the NHL. Nicklas Backstrom was a finalist for the Calder Trophy, but ended up second to the Chicago Blackhawks' Patrick Kane, though Backstrom was nonetheless selected to the All-Star Rookie Team. In addition to player awards, head coach Bruce Boudreau won the Jack Adams Award for the NHL's coach of the year. Ovechkin and Mike Green were named to the Sporting News All-Star team, with Ovechkin being the Sporting News Player of the Year.

The 2008–09 season was highlighted by the play of Mike Green (who was the third of the Capitals' three first-round selections in Ovechkin's draft year) and Ovechkin. Green led all NHL defensemen in goals and points, also setting the record for the longest consecutive goal-scoring streak by a defenseman with eight games. Ovechkin won his second Hart Trophy, his second Lester B. Pearson Award and his second Maurice "Rocket" Richard Trophy. The Capitals finished the regular season with a record of 50–24–8 and a team-record 108 points, and they won their second consecutive Southeast Division championship. They then defeated the New York Rangers in the first round of the 2009 playoffs four games to three, overcoming a 3–1 deficit. The Capitals were then defeated by the eventual Stanley Cup champions, the Pittsburgh Penguins, in the Eastern Conference Semifinals in seven games.

The Capitals finished the 2009–10 season regular season first in the NHL with 121 points, thereby winning the Presidents' Trophy. Ovechkin led the team in points with 109 and finished as the third-highest goal scorer, despite playing nine games fewer than the league leaders. Backstrom finished with 101 points, fourth-most in the NHL. Once again, Mike Green led all defensemen in points, finishing with 76. The Capitals also dominated the plus-minus category, finishing with five players in the top six in the league. Despite having a top-ranked regular season, Washington were defeated by the eighth-seeded Montreal Canadiens in the first round of the playoffs.

The 2010–11 season saw the Capitals repeat as the Southeast Division champions and as the top team in the Eastern Conference with 107 points. The season was highlighted by their participation in the 2011 NHL Winter Classic, where they defeated the Pittsburgh Penguins 3–1 at Heinz Field. However, the Capitals' playoff disappointment continued. After again defeating the New York Rangers in five games in the first round, they were swept by the Tampa Bay Lightning in the Eastern Conference Semifinals.

The Capitals started the 2011–12 season with a record of 7–0, but they only won five of their next 15 games. As a result, general manager George McPhee fired head coach Boudreau, hiring Capitals legend Dale Hunter as his replacement. By the end of the 2011–12 season, the team's top two goaltenders, Michal Neuvirth and Tomas Vokoun, were injured and the Capitals were required to lean on their goaltending prospect Braden Holtby to help the team into the 2012 playoffs. The Capitals made a strong push and finished with the seventh overall seed in East, drawing the defending champion Boston Bruins in the first round. The Capitals shocked the NHL by defeating the heavily favored Bruins in seven games on an overtime goal by Joel Ward. Every game in the series was decided by a one-goal margin; previously, no single series in the Stanley Cup playoffs had ever gone as far as six or seven games while neither team ever held more than a one-goal lead. The Capitals then advanced to the second round to face the top-seeded New York Rangers. The series again went seven games, ending with a 2–1 Rangers victory at Madison Square Garden. Following the season's end, head coach Dale Hunter announced he would step down. Adam Oates was later named permanent head coach of the team.

The lockout-shortened 2012–13 season saw the Capitals off to a rocky start, as they managed just two wins in their first ten games. The team rebounded to win the Southeast Division, thereby earning the third seed in the Eastern Conference playoffs. Unfortunately for Washington, the Capitals' playoff woes continued as they again fell to the Rangers in seven games.
In the 2013–14 season, the Capitals started the season winning five of their first ten games. The Capitals struggled to stay in a playoff spot and ultimately missed the playoffs for the first time since 2006–07. On April 26, 2014, 15 days after the regular season ended, the Capitals announced they would not renew general manager George McPhee's contract and that they had fired head coach Adam Oates.

On May 26, 2014, the Capitals announced the promotion of Brian MacLellan from director of player personnel to general manager and the hiring of Barry Trotz as the new head coach. In Ovechkin's 691st NHL game on November 4, 2014, he became the Capitals' all-time points leader during a game against the Calgary Flames, surpassing Peter Bondra. On January 1, 2015, the Washington Capitals defeated the Chicago Blackhawks 3–2 in the annual NHL Winter Classic at Nationals Park in Washington, D.C. The Capitals finished in a second-place tie with the New York Islanders in the Metropolitan Division during the 2014–15 season and held home-ice advantage in the first-round playoff series between the two, as they had defeated the Islanders in the season series with two home wins and two road overtime losses (in comparison, the Islanders had two home wins, one road loss and one road shootout loss). The teams split the first four games of the series, with the Islanders winning the first and third games, and the Capitals winning the second and fourth games. After winning Game 5, the Capitals had a chance to clinch the series in Nassau Veterans Memorial Coliseum, but the Islanders won Game 6 to send the series to a deciding Game 7 in Washington, which the Capitals would go on to win and defeat the Islanders, setting up a match-up against the top-seeded Rangers in the Second Round for the third time in four years.

In the second round, all seven games were decided by a one-goal margin. The Capitals and the Rangers split the first two games (with Joel Ward scoring a game-winning buzzer beater goal for Washington in Game 1, coupled with a loss by Washington in Game 2) by a 2–1 margin. Braden Holtby would then post a 1–0 shutout in Game 3, with Jay Beagle scoring the game's only goal, which was then followed by another 2–1 victory in Game 4. After Washington held a 3–1 series lead, the Rangers would then cut the series lead to 3–2 after scoring the game-tying goal and the game-winning overtime goal in Game 5. The Rangers then tied the series with a 4–3 victory in Game 6 to force a Game 7 at Madison Square Garden. Both teams scored a goal during regulation time in Game 7, but the Capitals would lose the game and the series in overtime via a Derek Stepan goal.

Back-to-back Presidents' Trophies and first Stanley Cup championship (2015–present)
In the 2015–16 season, the Capitals finished in first place in the league with a record of 56–18–8 and 120 points. In the first round of the playoffs, they would face the Philadelphia Flyers. The Capitals won the first three games of the series and were looking for their first sweep in the playoffs of a best-of-seven series in franchise history. However, the Flyers would win the next two games to send the series to a sixth game in Philadelphia; the Capitals nevertheless won that series in six games to advance to the second round of the playoffs. In the second round, they faced the Pittsburgh Penguins for the first time since 2009. After winning the first game of the series in Washington, the Capitals lost three straight games, and were in danger of elimination. Washington would stave off elimination with a win in Game 5, but they would lose the series in six games, with the Penguins going on to win the Stanley Cup.

Ovechkin reached the 1,000-point milestone on January 11, 2017, with a goal against the Pittsburgh Penguins 35 seconds into the first period of that game. Ovechkin is the 84th NHL player to reach the 1,000-point milestone, the fourth Russian-born player and the 37th player to reach the milestone while playing for one team throughout their NHL career. The Capitals won their second Presidents' Trophy in a row, becoming just the seventh team in NHL history to win back-to-back Presidents' Trophies. Ovechkin finished the 2016–17 regular season with 33 goals, leading the Capitals in goals for the twelfth straight season. In the 2017 playoffs, the Capitals defeated the Toronto Maple Leafs in six games in the first round to set up a second consecutive showdown with the Pittsburgh Penguins in the second round. After falling behind 3–1 in the series, they battled back to force a game seven at home, where they were eliminated 2–0, and lost their series 4–3.

After the 2017 playoffs, the Capitals were unable to retain a number of players, losing Kevin Shattenkirk, Karl Alzner, Justin Williams, and Daniel Winnik to free agency, and budding young defenseman Nate Schmidt to the 2017 NHL Expansion Draft. In addition, to get under the cap, the Capitals shipped Marcus Johansson to the New Jersey Devils. Despite a slow 5–6–1 start, which extended out to 10–9–1, the Capitals caught fire in December, going 10–2–2, and were able to clinch the Metropolitan Division for a third straight year on April 1. They qualified for the 2018 Stanley Cup playoffs for the 10th time in 11 years.

In the playoffs, the Capitals were able to battle back from a 2–0 series deficit against the Columbus Blue Jackets in the first round of the 2018 playoffs, winning four straight and beating the Blue Jackets in six games. They faced the Penguins again in the second round, and this time, on May 7, 2018, they were able to beat the Penguins in the second round with an overtime goal on the road in Game 6 by Evgeny Kuznetsov. It marked the first time in 20 seasons that the Capitals made a Conference Final and the first time in 24 seasons that they had defeated the Penguins in a playoff series.

The Capitals advanced to the 2018 Stanley Cup Finals on May 23, after beating the Tampa Bay Lightning in seven games after a 4–0 rout at Amalie Arena in Tampa. The Capitals then faced the expansion Vegas Golden Knights and overcame them in five games, including a 4–3 win in the decisive game five at T-Mobile Arena after Lars Eller scored with about seven minutes to go. Not only was it the Capitals' first Stanley Cup win, but it was also the first championship for a Washington, D.C. team in one of the four major North American sports leagues since the Redskins defeated the Buffalo Bills 26 years beforehand in Super Bowl XXVI.

On April 4, 2019, the Capitals clinched their fourth straight Metropolitan Division title and with that accomplishment, Washington became only the second organization in NHL history to win four consecutive division titles twice in their history (Boston Bruins from 1927–28 to 1930–31 and again from 1975–76 to 1978–79). The Capitals' previous streak was from the 2007–08 season to the 2010–11 season in the now-defunct Southeast Division. In the 2019 playoffs, the Capitals efforts to repeat as champions ultimately fell short, as they were eliminated in the first round by the Carolina Hurricanes in seven games. In the following season, the Capitals clinched another division title, but lost to the New York Islanders in the first round of the 2020 playoffs. The next season the Capitals finished second in the division, ultimately losing to the Boston Bruins in five games of the first round of the 2021 playoffs. Following their 3rd straight first round exit since their Stanley Cup win, the Washington Capitals started the following season strong, holding first place through the Christmas break. However, they ended up falling to 4th place in the division, which was good enough for the 2nd Wild card, and was matched against the Presidents trophy winning Florida Panthers in the first round of the 2022 playoffs, falling to them in 6 games.

Team information

Broadcasters
NBC Sports Washington (NBCSW) has carried Capitals games locally since its founding as Home Team Sports (HTS) in 1984. NBC Sports Washington was known as Comcast SportsNet Mid-Atlantic (CSN) from 2001 through 2017. NBCSW's commentators are Joe Beninati, Craig Laughlin, "Inside-the-Glass" reporter Alan May, and rinkside reporter Al Koken.

The Capitals' flagship radio station is WJFK-FM (106.7 FM); commentators are John Walton and Ken Sabourin. The team's radio network consists of stations in Washington, Virginia, Maryland, West Virginia, Pennsylvania, and North Carolina.

Mike Vogel has been covering the team online for the Washington Capitals on its website since the 1995–96 season, writing daily game stories and analysis. Vogel, who also participates in podcasts and in-stadium video presentations as well as guesting on various Washington DC radio and television programs, has been described as "the most interesting man in Caps media".

Historical
WTOP-TV (channel 9) picked up television coverage for the Capitals' first three seasons, covering 15 road games in the 1974–75 season. Sportscaster Warner Wolf was the commentator for the first season. Team radio broadcaster Ron Weber moved to the TV booth for telecasts in the second and third seasons. WTOP-TV's coverage was sporadic and poorly received, to the point of being called "revolting" by the Washington Post; game broadcasts were scheduled around network commitments and often joined live in progress or tape-delayed entirely. Station management had little interest in the games and said they received far more complaints about the preempted CBS shows. Before the 1977–78 season, the Capitals signed a five-year deal with WDCA (channel 20), which had regional cable carriage and as an independent station was able to commit to more expansive live coverage.

WDCA later split games with HTS/CSN upon its founding in 1984. The 1991–92 season illustrates a typical arrangement: WDCA showed 20 road games and any road playoff games, while HTS picked up 34 home games and any home playoff games, leaving 28 regular season games not televised. After 18 seasons on WDCA, the Capitals moved their over-the-air broadcasts to WBDC (channel 50) for the 1995–96 season. All 82 games were televised for the first time in the 2001–02 season. The Capitals have not aired any games over-the-air locally since the end of the 2005–06 season.

WTOP (1500 AM) was the Capitals' first radio home through the 1986–87 season. After nine years on WMAL (630 AM), the games returned to 1500 AM for the 1996–97 season. Ron Weber was the first announcer, and never missed a game through his retirement at the end of the 1996–97 season. WJFK-FM began airing postseason games during the 2008 playoffs. 1500 AM, since renamed WFED, remained the flagship station until 2012, when WJFK took over all coverage. WFED continues to broadcast games as a network affiliate. This is primarily to take advantage of its 50,000-watt clear-channel signal, which brings Capitals games to the entire eastern half of North America at night.

Weber rejoined current announcers Walton and Sabourin for the first period of Game 4 of the 2018 Stanley Cup Finals.

WJFK-FM attracted controversy when it elected to drop the Capitals in the 2016–17 season, leaving the Capitals to air solely on WFED. However, WFED's signal is unusable in some portions of the Washington suburbs at night, since it is directed north–south to protect co-channel KSTP. The Washington Wizards also took priority over the Capitals on WFED in case of a conflict, leading to some games in which the only home broadcast was available via Internet streaming. The team responded to fan complaints by reaching a temporary deal in January 2017 to place the rest of its games on WWDC-HD2, which is available metro-wide to those with HD Radios and has a low-powered analog signal that covers the city itself. The Capitals reached a deal to return to WJFK-FM for the 2017–18 season.

Logos and jerseys

The Capitals took to the ice in red, white and blue jerseys featuring contrast-colored shoulders and stars on the chest and sleeves based on the flag of the United States. The team originally had red, white, and blue pants options, but retired the white pants only after a few games in their first season, and the red ones at season's end. The blue pants would eventually become the only option used. The original logo crest underwent a few modifications throughout the jersey's history.

Prior to the start of the 1995–96 season, in an attempt to modernize the look and improve merchandise sales, the team abandoned its traditional red, white and blue color scheme in favor of a blue, black, and bronze palette with an American bald eagle with five stars as its logo. The alternate logo depicted the Capitol building with crossed hockey sticks behind. For the 1997–98 season, the team unveiled a black alternate jersey, devoid of blue with bronze stripes on the ends of sleeves and at the waist. The crest on the white and blue jerseys were the bald eagle logo, while the crest on the black jersey was the Capitol logo. Initially, the team name was placed along the bottom black stripe, but was removed on the white jersey in 1997, while it remained on the blue jersey until its retirement. Prior to the 2000–01 season, the team retired its blue road jersey in favor of the black alternate jersey, but still kept the white jersey for home games.

The Capitals unveiled new uniforms on June 22, 2007, which coincided with the NHL Entry Draft and the new league-wide adaptation of the Reebok-designed uniform system for 2007–08. The change marked a return to the red, white and blue color scheme originally used from 1974 to 1995. The new primary logo is reminiscent of the original Capitals' logo, complete with a hockey stick formed by the letter "t"; it also includes a new feature not present in the original logo in the form of three stars representing DC, Maryland and Virginia. More simply, the stars are a reference to the flag of Washington, D.C., which is in turn based on the shield of George Washington's family coat of arms. The new alternate logo uses an eagle in the shape of a "W" with the silhouette of the Washington Monument and the United States Capitol building in the negative space within and below.

For the 2011 NHL Winter Classic, the Capitals wore a white jersey honoring the franchise's past with the original logo. The jersey resembled the one the franchise wore from 1974 to 1995. Instead of wearing the combination of blue pants and white helmets the team used when it played at the Capital Centre, the Capitals chose red pants and helmets for the New Year's Day game. The Capitals wore the same jersey, minus the NHL Winter Classic patch, on February 1, 2011, to honor Hockey Hall of Fame winger Dino Ciccarelli.

The Capitals announced on September 16, 2011, that they would wear a third jersey modeled after the Winter Classic jersey for 16 road games during the 2011–12 season.

For the 2015 Winter Classic, which took place on New Year's Day at Nationals Park in Washington, D.C., the Capitals wore a newly designed jersey intended to pay homage to hockey's outdoor roots. The primary color of the jersey was a vintage deep red. The addition of stripes on the shoulders, waist and legs brought in elements of Washington's professional hockey jerseys from the 1930s, predating the Capitals franchise's formation in the 1970s. A large "W" on the front of the jersey, topped with the common three stars, offset in blue to contrast the white "Capitals" wordmark.

Starting with the 2015–16 season, the Capitals wore their throwback red third jerseys, replacing the white Winter Classic thirds.

Prior to the 2017–18 season, the NHL announced a new partnership with Adidas, and the Capitals unveiled new uniforms with minor changes. There were no third jerseys during that season, but the return of the program in the 2018–19 season saw the return of the Capitals' red throwback uniforms as their alternates.

For the 2018 Stadium Series, the Capitals used newly designed navy uniforms, honoring the fact that the game was held at the U.S. Naval Academy. The chest logo was based on the regular stylized "Capitals" logo, but shortened to "Caps", the nickname commonly used for the team. There were also features honoring various aspects of D.C., as well as the presence of a slightly altered W logo from the 2015 Winter Classic on the pants.

In 2021, as part of Adidas' "Reverse Retro" uniform series, the Capital unveiled a recolored version of their blue "screaming eagle" uniform used from 1995 to 2000. The base color is red with dark blue accents. The Capitals also replaced their throwback red alternates with a dark blue third jersey; this design featured three red stars and a uniquely-designed white "W" with the Washington Monument triangle in the middle. The uniform also features white/red/white stripes on the waist and sleeves and a white shoulder yoke. In 2022, a second "Reverse Retro" uniform was released, this time featuring a black version of the "screaming eagle" uniform with blue and bronze accents.

For the 2023 Stadium Series, the Capitals unveiled a white uniform centered around the alternate "Weagle" logo, with its navy wings extending towards the sleeves with white numbers.

Mascot

Since 1995, the Capitals' mascot has been Slapshot, a bald eagle that wears the number 00. Slapshot is seen before games driving his car on the ice and waving flags to excite the fans. He is also a common fixture of the community and attends Capitals functions and community activities, such as the annual Pride Parade.

Season-by-season record
This is a partial list of the last five seasons completed by the Capitals. For the full season-by-season history, see List of Washington Capitals seasons

Note: GP = Games played, W = Wins, L = Losses, OTL = Overtime Losses/SOL = Shootout Losses, Pts = Points, GF = Goals for, GA = Goals against

Players and personnel

Current roster

Head coaches

 Jim Anderson, 1974–1975
 Red Sullivan, 1975
 Milt Schmidt, 1975
 Tom McVie, 1975–1978
 Danny Belisle, 1978–1979
 Gary Green, 1979–1981
 Roger Crozier, 1981
 Bryan Murray, 1981–1990
 Terry Murray, 1990–1994
 Jim Schoenfeld, 1994–1997
 Ron Wilson, 1997–2002
 Bruce Cassidy, 2002–2003
 Glen Hanlon, 2003–2007
 Bruce Boudreau, 2007–2011
 Dale Hunter, 2011–2012
 Adam Oates, 2012–2014
 Barry Trotz, 2014–2018
 Todd Reirden, 2018–2020
 Peter Laviolette, 2020–present

Team captains

 Doug Mohns, 1974–1975
 Bill Clement, 1975–1976
 Yvon Labre, 1976–1978
 Guy Charron, 1978–1979
 Ryan Walter, 1979–1982
 Rod Langway, 1982–1992
 Kevin Hatcher, 1992–1994
 Dale Hunter, 1994–1999
 Adam Oates, 1999–2001
 Steve Konowalchuk and Brendan Witt, 2001–2002 
 Steve Konowalchuk, 2002–2003
 Jeff Halpern, 2005–2006
 Chris Clark, 2006–2009
 Alexander Ovechkin, 2010–present

League and team honors

Awards and trophies

Stanley Cup
 2017–18

Presidents' Trophy
 2009–10, 2015–16, 2016–17

Prince of Wales Trophy
 1997–98, 2017–18

Conn Smythe Trophy
 Alexander Ovechkin: 2017–18

Hart Memorial Trophy
 Alexander Ovechkin: 2007–08, 2008–09, 2012–13

Lester B. Pearson/Ted Lindsay Award
 Alexander Ovechkin: 2007–08, 2008–09, 2009–10

Art Ross Trophy
 Alexander Ovechkin: 2007–08

Maurice "Rocket" Richard Trophy
 Alexander Ovechkin: 2007–08, 2008–09, 2012–13, 2013–14, 2014–15, 2015–16, 2017–18, 2018–19, 2019–20

Calder Memorial Trophy
 Alexander Ovechkin: 2005–06

Frank J. Selke Trophy
 Doug Jarvis: 1983–84

James Norris Memorial Trophy
 Rod Langway: 1982–83, 1983–84

King Clancy Memorial Trophy
 Olaf Kolzig: 2005–06

Vezina Trophy
 Jim Carey: 1995–96
 Olaf Kolzig: 1999–00
 Braden Holtby: 2015–16

William M. Jennings Trophy
 Al Jensen and Pat Riggin: 1983–84
 Braden Holtby: 2016–17

Bill Masterton Memorial Trophy
 Jose Theodore: 2009–10

Jack Adams Award
 Bryan Murray: 1983–84
 Bruce Boudreau: 2007–08
 Barry Trotz: 2015–16

All-Rookie Team
 Scott Stevens: 1982–83
 Jim Carey: 1994–95
 Alexander Ovechkin: 2005–06
 Nicklas Backstrom: 2007–08
 John Carlson: 2010–11

NHL All-Star team
First Team All-Star
 Rod Langway: 1982–83, 1983–84
 Scott Stevens: 1987–88
 Jim Carey: 1995–96
 Olaf Kolzig: 1999–2000
 Alexander Ovechkin: 2005–06, 2006–07, 2007–08, 2008–09, 2009–10, 2012–13, 2014–15, 2018–19
 Mike Green: 2008–09, 2009–10
 Braden Holtby: 2015–16
 John Carlson: 2019–20

Second Team All-Star
 Pat Riggin: 1983–84
 Rod Langway: 1984–85
 Larry Murphy: 1986–87
 Al Iafrate: 1992–93
 Sergei Gonchar: 2001–02, 2002–03
 Alexander Ovechkin: 2010–11, 2012–13, 2013–14, 2015–16
 Braden Holtby: 2016–17
 John Carlson: 2018–19

First-round draft picks

 1974: Greg Joly (1st overall)
 1975: Alex Forsyth (18th overall)
 1976: Rick Green (1st overall) and Greg Carroll (15th overall)
 1977: Robert Picard (3rd overall)
 1978: Ryan Walter (2nd overall) and Tim Coulis (18th overall)
 1979: Mike Gartner (4th overall)
 1980: Darren Veitch (5th overall)
 1981: Bob Carpenter (3rd overall)
 1982: Scott Stevens (5th overall)
 1983: None
 1984: Kevin Hatcher (17th overall)
 1985: Yvon Corriveau (19th overall)
 1986: Jeff Greenlaw (19th overall)
 1987: None
 1988: Reggie Savage (15th overall)
 1989: Olaf Kolzig (19th overall)
 1990: John Slaney (9th overall)
 1991: Pat Peake (14th overall) and Trevor Halverson (21st overall)
 1992: Sergei Gonchar (14th overall)
 1993: Brendan Witt (11th overall) and Jason Allison (17th overall)
 1994: Nolan Baumgartner (10th overall) and Alexander Kharlamov (15th overall)
 1995: Brad Church (17th overall) and Miika Elomo (23rd overall)
 1996: Alexandre Volchkov (4th overall) and Jaroslav Svejkovsky (17th overall)
 1997: Nick Boynton (9th overall)
 1998: None
 1999: Kris Beech (7th overall)
 2000: Brian Sutherby (26th overall)
 2001: None
 2002: Steve Eminger (12th overall), Alexander Semin (13th overall), and Boyd Gordon (17th overall)
 2003: Eric Fehr (18th overall)
 2004: Alexander Ovechkin (1st overall), Jeff Schultz (27th overall), and Mike Green (29th overall)
 2005: Sasha Pokulok (14th overall) and Joe Finley (27th overall)
 2006: Nicklas Backstrom (4th overall) and Semyon Varlamov (23rd overall)
 2007: Karl Alzner (5th overall)
 2008: Anton Gustafsson (21st overall) and John Carlson (27th overall)
 2009: Marcus Johansson (24th overall)
 2010: Evgeny Kuznetsov (26th overall)
 2011: None
 2012: Filip Forsberg (11th overall) and Tom Wilson (16th overall)
 2013: Andre Burakovsky (23rd overall)
 2014: Jakub Vrana (13th overall)
 2015: Ilya Samsonov (22nd overall)
 2016: Lucas Johansen (28th overall)
 2017: None
 2018: Alexander Alexeyev (31st overall)
 2019: Connor McMichael (25th overall)
 2020: Hendrix Lapierre (22nd overall)
 2021: None
 2022: Ivan Miroshnichenko (20th overall)

Hall of Fame members
The Washington Capitals hold an affiliation with a number of inductees to the Hockey Hall of Fame. Eight inductees from the players category of the Hall of Fame are affiliated with the Capitals. In 2015, two former Capital players, Sergei Fedorov, and Phil Housley, were the latest Capitals players to be inducted into the Hall of Fame, with five out of the eight (Gartner, Oates, Stevens, Langway, and Murphy) having played at least five seasons with the club.

In addition to players, members of the local sports media that cover the Capitals, and the NHL, were honored by the Hockey Hall of Fame. In 2007, Dave Fay, a sports journalist for the Washington Times was a recipient of the Elmer Ferguson Memorial Award. In 2010, play-by-play radio broadcaster, Ron Weber, was awarded the Foster Hewitt Memorial Award from the Hall of Fame for his contributions to hockey broadcasting.

Retired numbers

 Although not officially retired, the team has not issued Olaf Kolzig's number 37 since his retirement.
 The NHL retired Wayne Gretzky's No. 99 for all its member teams at the 2000 NHL All-Star Game.

Franchise scoring leaders

These are the top-ten regular season point-scorers in franchise history. Figures are updated after each completed NHL regular season.
  – current Capitals player

Note: Pos = Position; GP = Games Played; G = Goals; A = Assists; Pts = Points; P/G = Points per game

See also

 Capitals–Flyers rivalry
 Capitals–Penguins rivalry
 Capitals–Rangers rivalry
 MedStar Capitals Iceplex
 List of Washington Capitals general managers
 Slapshot (mascot)

References
Footnotes

Citations

External links

 

 
National Hockey League teams
1974 establishments in Maryland
Metropolitan Division
Ice hockey clubs established in 1974
Ice hockey teams in Maryland
Ice hockey in Washington, D.C.